Alfred A. Hall (December 31, 1848 – January 21, 1912) was a Vermont attorney, politician and judge who served as President of the Vermont State Senate.

Biography
Alfred Allen Hall was born in Athens, Vermont, on December 31, 1848.  He was educated at Townshend's Leland and Gray Seminary, studied law, and began a practice in St. Albans in 1873. Among the prospective attorneys who studied in his office was Lee Stephen Tillotson.

A Republican, Hall served in local offices, including town meeting moderator, village president and school board member.  From 1882 to 1884 he was Franklin County State's Attorney.

Hall was a longtime member of the Vermont National Guard, enlisting as a private and attaining the rank of colonel on the staff of Governor Samuel Pingree.

An active Mason, in 1887 Hall laid the cornerstone at the dedication of the Bennington Battle Monument.

In 1892 Hall was elected to the Vermont Senate.  He served one term and was the Senate's President Pro Tem.  Hall was named a judge of the Vermont Superior Court in 1906.  He served until his death, and was succeeded by Frank L. Fish.

Judge Hall died in St. Albans on January 21, 1912.  He was buried at Saxtons River Cemetery in Saxtons River.

References 

1848 births
1912 deaths
People from Athens, Vermont
Republican Party Vermont state senators
Presidents pro tempore of the Vermont Senate
Vermont state court judges
People from St. Albans, Vermont
Vermont lawyers
State's attorneys in Vermont
Burials in Vermont
19th-century American judges
19th-century American lawyers